These are the results of the women's artistic individual all-around competition, one of six events for female competitors in artistic gymnastics at the 1956 Summer Olympics in Melbourne.

Competition format

The gymnastics competition continued to use the aggregation format. Each nation entered either a team of six gymnasts or up to three individual gymnasts. All entrants in the gymnastics competitions performed both a compulsory exercise and a voluntary exercise for each apparatus. The 8 exercise scores were summed to give an individual all-around total. No separate finals were contested.

Exercise scores ranged from 0 to 10, apparatus scores from 0 to 20, and individual totals from 0 to 80.

Results
The results of the individual all-around:

References

External links
Official Olympic Report
www.gymnasticsresults.com
www.gymn-forum.net

Women's artistic individual all-around
1956 in women's gymnastics
Women's events at the 1956 Summer Olympics